The 2013 NCAA Women's Division I Swimming and Diving Championships were contested at the 32nd annual NCAA-sanctioned swim meet to determine the team and individual national champions of Division I women's collegiate swimming and diving in the United States.

This year's events were hosted at the Indiana University Natatorium in Indianapolis, Indiana.

Georgia, runners up at the two previous championships, topped this year's team standings, finishing 84 points ahead of two-time defending champions California. This was the Lady Bulldogs' fifth women's team title.

Team standings
Note: Top 10 only
(DC) = Defending champions
Full results

Swimming results

See also
List of college swimming and diving teams

References

NCAA Division I Swimming And Diving Championships
NCAA Division I Swimming And Diving Championships
NCAA Division I Women's Swimming and Diving Championships